Ngozi Rosalin Monu (born 7 January 1981 in Lagos, Nigeria) is a Nigerian swimmer. Monu is the most prolific female swimmer from Nigeria. She focuses on the 50m & 100m freestyle event. Her inaugural Olympiads was at the 2000 Sidney Summer Olympics. She competed at the 2008 Summer Olympics. Uche Monu, her younger sister, is also a swimmer who represents Nigeria in the Backstroke and freestyle events.

2000 Summer Olympics

Monu's inaugural Olympiad was the [[2000 Summer Olympics[2000 Sidney Summer Olympics]]] at the age of 19. She won her heat in the women's 50 metre freestyle with a time of 28.20s, but she was ranked 57th out of 92 medal competitors.

2007 World Aquatics championships

At the World Aquatics Championship in Melbourne, Australia, Monu participated in the 50m with a time of 28.89 ranked 83rd, 100m freestyle with a time of 1.01.88 ranked 84th. And also Anchored the Nigerian team in the 400m freestyle and medley relays.

2008 Summer Olympics

In Beijing Monu represented Nigeria for the second time participating in the same event. She finished 6th in her Heat with a time of 27.39 which was short of advancing to the next stage. However it is one of the fastest times by a Nigerian woman in the event.

References

Living people
1981 births
Sportspeople from Lagos
Nigerian female swimmers
Olympic swimmers of Nigeria
Swimmers at the 2000 Summer Olympics
Swimmers at the 2008 Summer Olympics
African Games silver medalists for Nigeria
African Games medalists in swimming
Competitors at the 2003 All-Africa Games